The phallus tree was an art motif common in Western Europe during the late Middle Ages and the beginning of the Renaissance.

Its concrete significance is hazy, but it appeared in bronze, illuminated manuscript, and paint; it manifested as bawdy humour, religious parody, political comment. The Tuscan Massa Marittima mural, featuring oversized phalluses, some erect, complete with testes, was Guelph propaganda warning that if the Ghibellines were allowed to take control, they would bring with them sexual perversion and witchcraft.

References 

 Phallus tree in a Roman de la Rose manuscript.

Tree
Medieval art
Renaissance art
Iconography